Gemmula sogodensis is a species of sea snail, a marine gastropod mollusk in the family Turridae, the turrids.

Description
The length of the shell varies between 35 mm and 50 mm.

Distribution
This marine species occurs off the Philippines.

References

Olivera B.M. (2005). Evaluation of Philippine Gemmula I. Forms related to G. speciosa and G. kieneri. Science Dilliman. 17(1): 1-14

External links
 Gastropods.com: Gemmula (Gemmula - kieneri group) sogodensis

sogodensis
Gastropods described in 2004